is a Japanese football player who plays for FC Tokyo.

Playing career
Watanabe was born in Saitama Prefecture on October 2, 1996. He joined J2 League club Albirex Niigata in 2018.

References

External links

1996 births
Living people
Association football people from Saitama Prefecture
Japanese footballers
Japanese expatriate footballers
Regionalliga players
J2 League players
J1 League players
FC Ingolstadt 04 players
FC Ingolstadt 04 II players
Albirex Niigata players
Montedio Yamagata players
FC Tokyo players
Association football midfielders
Japanese expatriate sportspeople in Germany
Expatriate footballers in Germany